George Eaton (23 October 1904 – 28 May 1938) was an Australian cricketer. He played four first-class cricket matches for Victoria in 1931. His highest first-class score was 184 against Tasmania.

See also
 List of Victoria first-class cricketers

References

External links
 

1904 births
1938 deaths
Australian cricketers
Victoria cricketers
Cricketers from Durban